The 2018 Orange County SC season was the club's eighth season of existence, and their eighth consecutive season in the United Soccer League, the second tier of American soccer. Orange County also competed in the U.S. Open Cup. The season covered the period from October 14, 2017 to the beginning of the 2019 USL season.

OCSC won the Western Conference in the regular season, finishing one point ahead of runners-up Sacramento Republic. It marked the second time in club history that Orange County had topped the conference, after 2015. However, the club would be knocked out in the conference finals by eventual USL Cup runners-up Phoenix Rising. In the U.S. Open Cup, Orange County were eliminated in the second round by Golden State Force, failing to win a game in the competition for the fourth time in club history.

2018 marked the first season with Braeden Cloutier as the club's head coach, and Cloutier's first season as a professional head coach. The season averaged 3,095 fans per home match, and was the second consecutive season that the average attendance had increased.

Roster

Non-competitive

Preseason

Competitions

USL

Standings

Results summary

Results by round

Match results
In August 2017, the USL announced that the 2018 season would span 34 games, the longest regular season the league had ever run. The expansion was spurred by the addition of six new clubs for the 2018 season: Atlanta United 2, Fresno FC, Indy Eleven, Las Vegas Lights, Nashville SC, and North Carolina FC.

On January 14, 2018, the league announced home openers for every club. Orange County opened the season with a home match against Phoenix Rising, marking the first season-opening match to ever be played at Championship Soccer Stadium. In 2017, the club played its first four matches on the road before getting to open the new stadium on May 6.

The schedule for the remainder of the 2018 season was released on January 19. Orange County played three times against both LA Galaxy II and Phoenix. They played every other Western Conference team twice.

Postseason

U.S. Open Cup

Statistics

Appearances and goals

Disciplinary record

Clean sheets

Transfers

In

Loan in

Out

Awards

USL Team of the Week

USL Player of the Week

Postseason
USL All-League First Team
 FW Thomas Enevoldsen
 MF Aodhan Quinn

Kits

See also
 Orange County SC
 2018 in American soccer
 2018 USL season

References

Orange County SC seasons
Orange County SC
Orange County SC
Orange County SC